AFES may refer to:

 Alaska Agricultural and Forestry Experiment Station
 Australian Fellowship of Evangelical Students
 Automatic fire extinguishing system